The Live Music Archive (LMA), part of the Internet Archive, is an ad-free collection of over 170,000 concert recordings in lossless audio formats.  The songs are also downloadable or playable in lossy formats such as Ogg Vorbis or MP3.  The website is known for its extensive collection of Grateful Dead recordings, and contains music from many other bands.

History
The collection increases in size due to the contribution of concert recordings by etree participants.

Artists
The majority of artists are jam bands.  Others include The Smashing Pumpkins, Tenacious D, Warren Zevon, Ween, Little Feat. and smaller independent bands.

See also
 List of sound archives

References

External links

Internet Archive collections
Live music
American music websites
Online archives of the United States
Discipline-oriented digital libraries
Music archives in the United States